Washington Geraldo Dias Alves (born 3 September 1949) is a Brazilian former footballer who played as a central defender. After he ended his playing career, he worked as a manager in the Portuguese lower leagues.

Personal life
He played over ten years of his career in Portugal, where his children were born to a Portuguese mother.
His sons Geraldo, Bruno, and Júlio have played football on the professional level. His brother, Geraldo Assoviador, was also a footballer, in the midfielder position.

Notes

References

1949 births
Living people
Brazilian footballers
Association football defenders
Primeira Liga players
Liga Portugal 2 players
CR Flamengo footballers
América Futebol Clube (MG) players
S.C. Espinho players
Varzim S.C. players
Rio Ave F.C. players
Lusitânia F.C. players
F.C. Famalicão players
U.S.C. Paredes players
Brazilian expatriate footballers
Expatriate footballers in Portugal
Expatriate football managers in Portugal
Brazilian expatriate sportspeople in Portugal
Brazilian football managers
Brazilian expatriate football managers
Varzim S.C. managers